Out of Many, One is a 2018 American short documentary film directed by John Hoffman and Nanfu Wang. The film takes a look at the process of American immigration from the perspectives of the immigrants waiting for approval.

The documentary was released on Netflix on December 12, 2018.

References

External links
 
 
 

2018 short documentary films
Netflix original documentary films
American short documentary films
2010s English-language films
2010s American films